The 4 × 6 km mixed relay competition at the Biathlon World Championships 2023 was held on 8 February 2023.

Results
The race was started at 14:45.

References

Mixed relay